Abdullah Kadwani  is a Pakistani actor, producer and director.

As of 2019, he holds the position of group managing director at Geo Entertainment, a leading television network in Pakistan. He is currently responsible for "Geo Entertainment Holdings of TV channels; Geo Films, Geo Kahani, Fire Records and all Geo Entertainment properties."

In an article by Daily Times Pakistan, it was reported that Abdullah Kadwani was amongst the esteemed panel of judges from around the world for the prestigious Rose d'OR Awards.

Being a renowned Pakistani actor, director and producer, Kadwani has an experience of more than 25 years in the film and TV industry of Pakistan. He has three children. One of them, Haroon Kadwani recently appeared in blockbuster movie Ruposh and is an aspiring actor like his father. He has produced and created several popular award-winning drama serials including Khaani (2017), Khuda Aur Mohabbat (2021), Meri Zaat Zarra e Benishan (2009), Daam (2010), Doraha (2008) and Shehr e Zaat (2012).

Career 
In an interview to Images by Dawn, Abdullah Kadwani mentions about his early days as a model as he remained amongst the top models in the country during the 1990s, having more than 25 television commercials to his credit.

When it comes to acting, in 1995 he appeared in STN's Chand Grehan while in 1994 he starred  in a PTV telefilm, Adam Hawwa Aur Shaitan and he worked in Hawain in 1997. Later performed in more than fifty television drama serials until 2012.

When it comes to production, Kadwani formed 7th Sky Entertainment, a premier broadcast and film entertainment company in 2004. It is reported that under the leadership of Abdullah Kadwani and Asad Qureshi, 7th Sky Entertainment has produced over 130 projects in a span of 16 years.

List of television serials

List of films
Chambaili (2013 film)
Armaan (2013 film)

See also 
 List of Lollywood actors

References

External links 
 

Pakistani film producers
Pakistani male television actors
Pakistani television directors
Living people
Pakistani television producers
Male actors from Karachi
St. Patrick's High School, Karachi alumni
1968 births